Lieutenant General Shankarrao Pandurang Patil (SPP) Thorat, KC, DSO (12 August 1906 - 10 August 1992) was a General Officer in the Indian Army. He was the General Officer Commanding-in-Chief Eastern Command in the lead up to the 1962 Sino-Indian War.

Early life
Thorat was born on 12 August 1906, in Vadgaon village, Kolhapur State, British India.  He studied at S P College, Pune and then at the Royal Military College, Sandhurst, from where he commissioned into the British Indian Army.

Military career

World War II
By World War II, Thorat was a lieutenant colonel and commanded battalions during the Burma campaign against Japan. He attended Staff College, Quetta in 1941 and after a brief posting to the army HQ, Thorat joined the 4th battalion, 14th Punjab Regiment, which, as part of the 114th Indian Infantry Brigade under the 7th Indian Infantry Division, played a role in clearing Japanese forces from the Naga Hills. He participated in small actions with 4/14th Punjab and after a short stay, transferred to the 9th battalion, 14th Punjab Regiment under the 20th Indian Infantry Division, which was engaged in fighting on the Imphal plains. The commanding officer of 9/14th Punjab went down with dysentery and Thorat temporarily took command of the battalion. Since it was his first time commanding a battalion, he accompanied his troops on a long reconnaissance patrol, which his brigade commander didn't approve of. In November 1944 Thorat received his first official battalion command, and took command of the 2nd battalion, 2nd Punjab Regiment under the 51st Indian Infantry Brigade. This brigade became known as the "Indian Brigade" because unlike other British Indian Army brigades which were composed of 2 Indian battalions and 1 British battalion, the 51st Brigade had 3 Indian battalions. Additionally, all 3 battalions in the brigade had Indian commanding officers - K.S. Thimayya, L.P. Sen, and Thorat. These 3 were among the few Indian officers above the rank of major who saw intense action during the war.

Battle of Kangaw
In January 1945 2/2nd Punjab participated in the battle of Kangaw. The 51st Brigade had been assigned the task of clearing strongly fortified Japanese rearguard positions, and Thorat coordinated his battalion's attack with artillery and air support. However, the battalion still took heavy casualties as they advanced through rice paddies to close with the Japanese. At one point Thorat engaged in hand-to-hand combat, during which he killed a young Japanese officer and seized his sword. After his initial attack had succeeded, Thorat limited his battalion's advance and consolidated their position of half of the hill feature. He was fully aware of the Japanese tactic of evacuating a position under attack and then swiftly counterattacking to retake it, thus inflicting maximum casualties on their enemy. When the counterattack came, it was repelled by prepared battalion defences and air strikes.

GOC-in-C Eastern Command 
Thorat took over the eastern command in 1957. At the time the headquarters of the eastern command was based in Lucknow. It was only in 1959, following incidents such as the Longju incident, when border defence was shifted to the military. Accordingly, Thorat made an assessment of the requirements needed to plug vulnerabilities and repel a Chinese invasion. In October 1959, Thorat's plan was sent to General Thimayya who in turn showed it to the Defence Minister VK Krishna Menon. Menon dismissed the report. Exercise Lal Qila was conducted on 17 March 1960 at the Eastern Command Headquarters under Lieutenant General Thorat. It was another attempt to show the serious vulnerabilities in the eastern sector. It detailed the threat from China and what India needed to do to plug vulnerabilities.

Dates of rank

Works
From Reveille to Retreat (1986). Allied Publishers. .

Notes

References

External links
"The Two Myths of 1962". Institute for Defence Studies and Analyses. 31 October 2012.

1906 births
1992 deaths
Indian Army personnel of World War II
Indian generals
Graduates of the Royal Military College, Sandhurst
Recipients of the Padma Shri in civil service
Companions of the Distinguished Service Order
Graduates of the Staff College, Quetta
Indian Companions of the Distinguished Service Order
Recipients of the Kirti Chakra